Popule meus (My people) is a motet for Good Friday by Tomás Luis de Victoria. He set a liturgical text  from the Improperia, which contains the Greek-Latin Trisagion, prescribed for use in the Catholic responsory for Good Friday. It begins "Popule meus, quid feci tibi?" (My people, what have I done to you?). The composition, scored for four voices, SATB, was published in Rome in 1585 in Officium Hebdomadae Sanctae (Office of the Holy Week).

History, text and music 
Victoria, a late Renaissance Spanish composer, set a liturgical text from the Improperia (Reproaches) prescribed for the Catholic liturgy on Good Friday. Victoria set two refrains, one from the ninth century, worded as if Jesus on the Cross addressed his people: "Popule meus, quid feci tibi?" (My people, what have I done to you?), the other the Trisagion (in Greek, "thrice holy") and its Latin translation. The refrains are used during the Veneration of the Cross in the liturgy, chanted by two choirs in antiphonal singing, one singing the Greek, the other one the Latin. The Greek text is the only remnant in Greek in the Roman liturgy besides the Kyrie eleison.

The composition was published by Alessandro Gardane in Rome in 1585 as No. 27 of the collection Officium Hebdomadae Sanctae (Office of the Holy Week). It is scored for four voices, SATB. Victoria's setting of the two refrains has been described as "of compelling beauty" and "music of great expressiveness", achieved by simple harmonies, mostly in homophony.

Recording 
The motet has been recorded often, as part of different collections. A 1996 recording offers music by Victoria, including his Missa Dum Complerentur, sung by the Westminster Cathedral Choir, conducted by James O'Donnell. A 2004 collection offers the motet as part of music from the time of the reign of Philip II of Spain, performed by Musica Ficta. A 2015 recording presents it as part of music from the Papal Sistine Chapel, performed by the Sistine Chapel Choir, conducted by Massimo Palombella.

Literature

References

External links 
 
 
 Tomás Luis de Victoria / Popule meus / Improperien am Karfreitag Carus-Verlag 2013
Tomas Luis de Victoria: Popule meus (the Reproaches), sung by St Peter's Singers of Leeds via YouTube
Victoria: Improperia (The Reproaches) aka Popule Meus via YouTube

Choral compositions
Compositions by Tomás Luis de Victoria